Agent mining is an interdisciplinary area that synergizes multiagent systems with data mining and machine learning.

The interaction and integration between multiagent systems and data mining have a long history. The very early work on agent mining focused on agent-based knowledge discovery, agent-based distributed data mining, and agent-based distributed machine learning, and using data mining to enhance agent intelligence.

The International Workshop on Agents and Data Mining Interaction has been held for more than 10 times, co-located with the International Conference on Autonomous Agents and Multi-Agent Systems. Several proceedings are available from Springer Lecture Notes in Computer Science.

References 

Multi-agent systems
Data mining